Charnwood is a suburb in the Belconnen district of Canberra located within the Australian Capital Territory, Australia.

Design
Charnwood's estate design was based on the Radburn principle. Under this design, houses were to face common parkland, with the suburb's streets servicing garages situated at the rear of the houses. The design failed in its application, however, as home owners built fences around the "park side" of their blocks, effectively screening the houses away from the common parkland. This created long, narrow, fenced walkways, with poor lighting and no neighbourhood surveillance. The original design for the network of pathways was to make it possible to walk from any point in the suburb to any other without directly crossing a road; pedestrian bridges can be used to cross the few major streets within the suburb.

Charnwood is the location of the Charnwood centre shopping area which serves surrounding suburbs. The shopping centre includes several fast food outlets, a branch of the Labor Club, a Shell Service Station and a Woolworths.  An emergency services station incorporating ambulance, fire and rescue services was opened in October 2013 by the Minister for Police and Emergency Services, and is located near the Charnwood shops at the south-west corner of Lhotsky Street and Tillyard Drive abutting Ginninderra Dr.

Education
Charnwood is home to Charnwood-Dunlop Primary School, Saint Thomas Aquinas Catholic Primary School, Saint Thomas Aquinas Catholic Church and Charnwood High School (now closed and housing the Canberra Christian Life Centre and the Brindabella Christian College Charnwood Campus).

Naming

Street names in Charnwood are named after New South Wales pioneers and the suburb name 'Charnwood' was gazetted on 9 September 1971.

Interests

From 2004 to 2018 there was an annual carnival call the 'Charny Carny', a unique event which benefited Saint Thomas Aquinas Catholic Primary School, Charnwood-Dunlop Primary School and Mount Rogers Scout Group. This carnival had the traditional purpose of building community spirit and donates funds for both the schools and the Scout Group.

On 4 March 2020 the West Belconnen Charny Carny Association Incorporated who run the Charny Carny announced that the carnival would no longer be running, due to not having enough volunteers on the committee to run the event.

Sporting facilities
The Charnwood District Playing Fields are home to the Ginninderra "The Tigers" athletics club during the track season (October – March).

Governance 
For the purposes of Australian federal elections for the House of Representatives, Charnwood is in the seat of Fenner.

For the purposes of Australian Capital Territory elections for the ACT Legislative Assembly, Charnwood is in the Ginninderra electorate.

Geology

Rocks in Charnwood are from the Silurian age. Deakin Volcanics purple rhyodacite is found in most of Charnwood. The Deakin Fault passes in the north west direction on the north east edge of the Deakin Volcanics, The fault dropped down the Deakin Volcanics and raised up the south west side. Hawkins Volcanics green-grey dacite and quartz andesite are in the north east on the other side of Deakin Fault.

References

Suburbs of Canberra
Radburn design housing estates